Feudin' Fools is a 1952 comedy film starring The Bowery Boys. The film was released on September 21, 1952 by Monogram Pictures and is the twenty-seventh film in the series.

Plot
Sach inherits a farm and the boys travel to it.  They discover that their neighbors are the Smiths, who have feuded with the Joneses, of which Sach is one.  They keep Sach's identity secret, and become friends with them.  A gang of bank robbers arrive and hide out in the boys house.  The Smiths arrive and, thinking the robbers names are Jones, begin shooting at them.  The law arrives and takes the criminals away, but Slip accidentally says he is "Mr. Jones" and the Smiths begin shooting at him!

Cast

The Bowery Boys
Leo Gorcey as Terrance Aloysius 'Slip' Mahoney
Huntz Hall as Horace Debussy 'Sach' Jones
David Gorcey as Chuck (Credited as David Condon)
Bennie Bartlett as Butch

Remaining cast
Bernard Gorcey as Louie Dumbrowski
Anne Kimbell as Ellie Mae Smith
Dorothy Ford as Tiny Smith
Paul Wexler as Luke Smith
Robert Easton as Caleb Smith
Lyle Talbot as Big Jim

Production
This is the first film where the gang consists of only four members, a size it would stay until the end of the series.

Home media
Warner Archives released the film on made-to-order DVD in the United States as part of "The Bowery Boys, Volume Three" on October 1, 2013.

References

External links

1952 comedy films
1952 films
American black-and-white films
Bowery Boys films
Monogram Pictures films
Films directed by William Beaudine
American comedy films
1950s English-language films
1950s American films